Thai Song, or Lao Song, is a Tai language of Thailand. The Tai Song originally settled in Phetchaburi Province, and from there went to settle in various provinces such as Kanchanaburi, Ratchaburi, Suphanburi, Nakhon Pathom, Samut Sakhon, Samut Songkhram, Nakhon Sawan, and Phitsanulok.

Phonology

Consonants

Further reading
Miyake, Marc. 2014. Averaging Thai Song tones.

References

Southwestern Tai languages
Languages of Thailand